Monstropalpus helleri is a species of beetle in the family Cerambycidae, and the only species in the genus Monstropalpus. It was described by Franz in 1953.

References

Xylorhizini
Beetles described in 1953